Osoyoos Lake State Park was a Washington state park in Okanogan County until it was sold to the city of Oroville and renamed Osoyoos Lake Veteran’s Memorial Park. The park has a  sandy beach on Osoyoos Lake, boat ramp, and campground.

References

External links
Osoyoos Lake Veteran’s Memorial Park City of Oroville, Washington

Parks in Okanogan County, Washington